Eugene Cyrus Woodruff (April 8, 1871 – March 20, 1944) was an American football coach and electrical engineer.

University of Michigan
Woodruff graduated from the University of Michigan with degrees in engineering (BS, 1894; PhD, 1900) and music (MS, 1896).

Montana Agricultural
Woodruff served as the head football coach at the Agricultural College of the State of Montana–now known as Montana State University—in Bozeman, Montana for one season in 1900.

Academic career
Woodruff spent the later part of his career as a faculty member at Pennsylvania State University in State College, Pennsylvania and Millikin University in Decatur, Illinois.

Death
Woodruff died of a heart attack on March 20, 1944, in State College, Pennsylvania.

Head coaching record

References

1871 births
1944 deaths
American electrical engineers
Millikin University faculty
Montana State Bobcats football coaches
Pennsylvania State University faculty
University of Michigan alumni